Olivier Pramil (born June 4, 1979) is a French professional rugby league footballer currently playing for RC Lescure-Arthes XIII. He has previously played for the New York Knights rugby league team in the AMNRL and Toulouse Olympique in the Co-Operative Championship as well as the France national rugby league team.

Playing career

RC Lescure-Arthes XIII
On 21 Oct 2009 it was reported that he had signed for RC Lescure-Arthes XIII in the Elite Two Championship

International
He made his début in a 2002 Mediterranean Cup match v Lebanon, coming off the inter-change bench on 2 Nov 2002; France lost 6-36

References 

1979 births
Expatriate rugby league players in the United States
France national rugby league team players
French expatriate rugby league players
French expatriate sportspeople in the United States
French rugby league players
Living people
New York Knights players
RC Lescure-Arthes XIII players
Rugby league props
Rugby league second-rows
Toulouse Olympique players